The Baron of Arede Coelho was a noble title created by King Carlo I, by decree on 24 November 1898, in favour of José Inácio Coelho.

List of barons
 José Inácio Coelho, 1st Baron of Arêde Coelho;

References
Notes

Sources
 

Arede Coelho
1898 establishments in Portugal